Tipperary County Council is the authority responsible for local government in County Tipperary, Ireland. It came into operation on 3 June 2014 after the 2014 local elections, following the merger of North Tipperary County Council and South Tipperary County Council under the provisions of the Local Government Reform Act 2014. As a county council, it is governed by the Local Government Act 2001. The council is responsible for housing and community, roads and transportation, urban planning and development, amenity and culture, and environment. The council has 40 elected members. Elections are held every five years and are by single transferable vote. The head of the council has the title of Cathaoirleach (Chairperson). The county administration is headed by a Chief Executive, Joe MacGrath. The administrative centres are Nenagh and Clonmel.

Local Electoral Areas and Municipal Districts
Tipperary County Council is divided into local electoral areas, defined by electoral divisions, and into borough and municipal districts for the purposes of local exercising of the powers of the local authority. The municipal district which contains the administrative area of the former Clonmel Borough Council is referred to as a Borough District.

Councillors

2019 seats summary

Councillors by electoral area
This list reflects the order in which councillors were elected on 24 May 2019.

Notes

Co-options

References

External links

Politics of County Tipperary
County councils in the Republic of Ireland
2014 establishments in Ireland